The Chester County Council is a Boy Scouts of America service council that serves members of the Cub Scouts, Scouts BSA, and Venturing programs in Chester County, Pennsylvania and Northeastern Cecil County, Maryland.  It is one of the oldest councils in the nation, and is one of two single-county councils left in Pennsylvania, the other being Chief Cornplanter Council in Warren, PA.

Organization

The council is administratively divided into three districts:

Diamond Rock District
Horseshoe Trail District
Octoraro District

History

The Chester County Council was formed by a charter by the National BSA Council in 1919, and was charged with overseeing the Scouts in Chester County under the leadership of Dr. Arthur A. Schuck, who later became the third Chief Scout Executive in the BSA and who had previously been Deputy Chief Scout Executive under Dr. James West.  In the early years, the council, forming in the wake of the armistice ending World War I, was able to consolidate the independent troops, despite most of the adults that were qualified being off in Europe.

In the 1920s, the council, under the leadership of Charles Heistand, underwent a metamorphosis that resulted in the acquisition of a new Scout camp, and the formation of its own Order of the Arrow lodge.  Prior to the acquisition of the Reynolds Farm property on the Mason–Dixon line near Rising Sun, Maryland and Oxford, Pennsylvania, Scouts attending summer camp were loaded up onto military trucks, and then shipped out to Camp Rothrock, the council's old summer camp property located near Carlisle, Pennsylvania.  The council longed for a camp closer to home, and after being rejected by the former Philadelphia Area Council as being "too far", the council acquired the Reynolds Farm, then a moonshiner haven, and the new camp, the Horseshoe Scout Reservation, opened its doors in 1928.

Just a year before, Heistand inquired about starting an Order of the Arrow lodge in the council, and contacted Dr. E. Urner Goodman, who was then serving as the Grand Lodge Chief (now the National Chief of the Order of the Arrow).  After a failed attempt in trying to get the Philadelphia Council's OA Lodge, Unami Lodge, to install its chartered members, Goodman himself conducted the first induction ceremony, at Camp Hillsdale, near West Chester.  Heistand, Joseph Brinton (who later became the National OA Conference Chief and Chief Scout Executive), and several other members were inducted, and Octoraro Lodge #22 was born.

Since the opening of the camp and the founding of the OA lodge, the council has seen its fair share of growth throughout the county, eventually extending down into Cecil County, Maryland with the formation of several Boy Scout troops and Cub Scout packs as far south as Port Deposit, Maryland.  Most of this achievement was under the direction of Lewis Lester, who was the longest serving Scout Executive of the council (in the 1940s and 1950s), and was influential in expanding the facilities at both Camps Horseshoe and Jubilee (later to become Camp John H. Ware, III).  More recent additions to the council included the relocation of the council service center from downtown West Chester to an office building just off of the U.S. Highway 202 bypass in Westtown Township, Pennsylvania, and the opening of the "Cub Town" facilities at Camp Ware in 2004.

Camps

The Horseshoe Scout Reservation is a Boy Scouts of America camp, owned by the Chester County Council, and located on the Mason-Dixon line separating Pennsylvania and Maryland.  The name of the camp derives from the Octoraro Creek, a tributary of the Susquehanna River, that makes a meandering 4-mile horseshoe through the property.

Camp John H. Ware, III is a Boy Scout and Cub Scout summer, winter, and weekend camp located in Peach Bottom, Pennsylvania on the Horseshoe Scout Reservation. It is organized by Boy Scouts of America. It shares the reservation with Camp Horseshoe, located on the other side of the Octoraro River. The camp, formerly known as Camp Jubilee, offers a wide variety of activities for young men to participate in while earning merit badges and advancing in rank.

The camp offers its accommodations in all seasons, however it is not staffed throughout the year. The only time when a full complement of staff is present is summer camp. During the winter camping season, the rangers staff the Trading Post, offering food and small souvenirs, including T-shirts and other supplies.

Order of the Arrow
Octoraro Lodge #22 is the local chapter of the Order of the Arrow affiliated with Chester County Council.

Octoraro Lodge #22 supports Horseshoe Scout Reservation, including both Camp Horseshoe and Camp Ware, with thousands of annual volunteer hours of service and multiple fundraisers throughout the year.  The purpose of Octoraro Lodge #22 is to support camping throughout Chester County Council.

The council's Order of the Arrow lodge, Octoraro Lodge #22, was formed in 1927 under the leadership of Charles Heistand and Joseph Brinton, with its first members being inducted by Dr. E. Urner Goodman himself. Octoraro #22 celebrated it Diamond Jubilee in the 2001-2002 season.

In 1946, in the spirit of the lodge's chartering by Dr. Goodman, members of the lodge traveled south to Norfolk, Virginia and inducted the first members of Blue Heron Lodge 349.  Both Octoraro and Blue Heron share good relationships and invite members to each other's fall fellowship weekends in September (Octoraro Lodge) and October (Blue Heron).

Octoraro Lodge, which takes its name from the Octoraro Creek, a tributary of the Susquehanna River, uses the Canada goose as its lodge "totem" or symbol.  Early lodge patches and pocket flaps had white geese, with the "W.W.W." stitched in the center and bisected with a horizontally-facing arrow, but since 1971, all flaps used real-colored geese, and a horseshoe (representing the Horseshoe Scout Reservation) diagonally bisected by a red arrow.  Prized flaps include the "Cut-Edge Blue," which is the very first pocket flaps issued by the lodge in the mid-1950s, and the gold-bordered 50th Anniversary flap, issued in 1976 for the lodge's golden anniversary.  Both flaps fetch over $100 at auctions.

Notable people
Because of the council's history, members have gone onto higher office at the Area, Regional, and National levels of the BSA.  A list of those who served at the national level, or in public office, is listed below.

      Bill Folger – President of the American Society For The Adoption Of The Metric System
 Arthur A. Schuck – 1st Scout Executive, later the third Chief Scout Executive of the BSA
 Hon. Owen J. Roberts – Associate Justice of the U.S. Supreme Court
 Hon. John H. Ware, III – U.S. Congressman from Oxford
 Dick Vermeil – retired NFL coach and member of the council's executive board.  His annual "Dick Vermeil Invitational" golf tournaments bring in over $1 million each year to help with council operations.

See also
Scouting in Pennsylvania

References

External links
Chester County Council Website
Horseshoe Scout Reservation Website
Horseshoe Scout Reservation Alumni Association Website

Local councils of the Boy Scouts of America
Cecil County, Maryland
Chester County, Pennsylvania
Youth organizations based in Pennsylvania
Northeast Region (Boy Scouts of America)
Youth organizations established in 1919
1919 establishments in Pennsylvania